Simone Buttigieg (born 31 October 1994) is a Maltese footballer who plays as a midfielder for Birkirkara and the Malta national team.

International career
Buttigieg made her debut for the Malta national team on 7 April 2019, as a starter against Romania.

See also
List of Malta women's international footballers

References

1994 births
Living people
Women's association football midfielders
Maltese women's footballers
Malta women's international footballers
Birkirkara F.C. (women) players